Alain Bouquin (born 1958) was a Général of the French Army and the Commandant of the Foreign Legion.

Military career 

Saint-Cyrien of the promotion of « Général Paul-Frédéric Rollet » (1978–1980), he was assigned after one year at Montpellier, to the 4th Foreign Regiment 4e RE in 1980. One year later in 1981, he was assigned to the 2nd Foreign Parachute Regiment 2e R.E.P until 1990, occupying the functions of section (platoon) chief, assistant officer, Commandant (Major) of a combat company, then officer in charge of the instruction and operations bureau.
 
After one year at the general staff headquarters of the 3rd Corps, he integrated in 1991 National Superior Technical Advanced School as a trainee of the technical brevet of the EMSST. Graduate in 1993 of the 107th promotion of the Superior Course of the general staff headquarters, he joined on year later, the 2nd promotion of the Interarm Defense College.

From 1995 to 2000, he served successively at the general staff headquarters of the Armies at the bureau of study then at the general staff headquarters staff of French Forces stationed in Djibouti as division chief of operations.

In 2000, he was designated as the regimental commander of the 2ème REP. During his command tenure, he rejoined the Interarm Defense College as the chief cell of operational simulations, before being the auditor of the 54th promotion of CHEM and the 57th promotion of the Institute of Superior National Defense Studies.

Prior to assuming the command of the French Foreign Legion, général Bouquin was assigned since 2005 at the general staff headquarters of the French Army (EMAT) where he occupied in his last year the post of Secretary General Council of Systems Forces.

Général de brigade since 1 August 2008, he assumed the command of the Foreign Legion in 2009, a post which he held till 2011. During his career, général Bouquin participated to numerous exterior operations, most notably in Chad and Central African Republic (1984, 1986, 1988, 1989) as well as Kosovo in 2001.

On 1 April 2011, général Bouquin was promoted to the rank of Général de division  and while in function, he was subsequently promoted to Général de corps d'armée.

Recognitions and honors 

  Officier of the Legion of Honour
  Officier of the Ordre national du Mérite
  Croix de la Valeur Militaire (1 bronze star)
  Croix du combattant
  Médaille d'Outre-Mer
  Médaille de la Défense nationale (médaille d'argent)
  Medaille de Reconnaissance de la Nation (d'Afrique du Nord)
  Médaille commémorative française

See also 

Major (France)
French Foreign Legion Music Band (MLE)

References 

French generals
ENSTA Paris alumni
Living people
Officers of the French Foreign Legion
1958 births
French Army officers
Officiers of the Légion d'honneur
Officers of the Ordre national du Mérite
Recipients of the Cross for Military Valour